Return of 4Eva is a 2011 self-produced official mixtape by rapper and producer Big K.R.I.T. released on March 28, 2011. The mixtape features guest appearances from Chamillionaire, Raheem DeVaughn, Joi, Big Sant, and fellow Mississippian, David Banner. Released to critical acclaim, it was named the 32nd best album of 2011 by Rolling Stone, 27th by Spin, and an honorable mention by Pitchfork.

Track listing 
All songs written and composed by Big K.R.I.T.

Notes

 The physical release replaces "Country Shit (Remix)" with "Shake Junt"
The streaming version excludes the tracks "R4 Theme Song", "Sookie Now", "Made Alot", "Time Machine", "Amtrak", "The Vent", and "Country Shit (Remix)", bringing the total length to 48:06

R4: The Prequel
The mixtape was released to iTunes as an EP on June 7, 2011. It featured four songs from the mixtape, plus one remix.

References 

2011 albums
Big K.R.I.T. albums
Albums produced by Big K.R.I.T.